Cassils is a Scottish surname, and may refer to:

Cassils (artist), Canadian artist and bodybuilder
Cassils, Alberta, a hamlet in Canada

See also
Cassilis (disambiguation)
Earl of Cassilis, pronounced "Cassils", Dumbarton Castle